Orgill is a surname. Notable people with the surname include:

Dever Orgill (born 1990), Jamaican footballer
Nikola Orgill (born 1993), Australian soccer player

See also
Orgill